In the End is the eighth and final studio album by Irish alternative rock band The Cranberries, released on 26 April 2019 by BMG. It is the band's first and only release since the death of singer Dolores O'Riordan, whose vocals are featured posthumously. The surviving instrumentalists pieced together her demos with in-studio recordings over the course of the subsequent year and worked with long-time producer Stephen Street to finalise the album. Critical reception was positive. This is the last studio album before the band’s official disbandment was confirmed and announced in 2019.

Recording and release
Guitarist Noel Hogan and vocalist Dolores O'Riordan began composing songs for the album while on tour in May 2017; the first track that Hogan wrote was "A Place I Know" while touring in Poland. The band ended up canceling several North American tour dates when O'Riordan suffered a herniated disc. That June, Hogan spent time in France writing and sending his demos to O'Riordan in New York City to add lyrics. Together they wrote and demoed 11 songs that winter, with the final emails from O'Riordan arriving to Hogan hours before she died. The surviving bandmates set aside her vocals for several months following her death and after getting the full support from O'Riordan's family, they brought in Stephen Street—who produced several of their albums—to complete the recording sessions in April and May. The band avoided using pitch correction on O'Riordan's vocals, with Hogan stating: "She would absolutely kill us". Due to some tracks being incomplete, the band brought in backing vocalist Johanna Cranitch, who had toured with the band from 2012 to 2017, to fill in the gaps. By October 2018, the recordings were complete. A month earlier, Noel Hogan confirmed that the Cranberries moniker would be retired after the album's release.

The album’s cover image was taken by the band’s original photographer Andy Earl and sleeve designer Cally Calloman. On the first anniversary of O'Riordan's death, "All Over Now" was released as a streaming advance single. The song debuted at 25 on the Adult Alternative Songs. On 1 March, they released "The Pressure" for digital streaming, followed by a music video for "All Over Now" on 7 March. "Wake Me When It's Over" debuted on 19 March. Lastly, the title track was made available on 16 April.

For most of the tracks, the first time they were performed in studio was the only time: the surviving band members did not intend to perform them live and therefore no accompanying tour or promotional performances were held.

Critical reception

 BeatRoute's Jennie Orton gave the album a positive review calling it a fitting end to the band and writing that they, "ha[ve] done a stellar job of embracing the sadness of the material, as if to give themselves and the rest of us a place to put the grief about O’Riordan's pain and how it ultimately got the best of her". In The Irish Times, Eamon Sweeney gave the album four out of five stars, calling it "remarkably uplifting". Asya Draganova gave the recording three out of five stars, writing for The Arts Desk that it's, "a tribute to the friendship and the shared path of her fellow band members Noel Hogan, Mike Hogan, Fergal Lawler—illustrating well how the four had grown together with their audience over thirty or so years." Writing for NME, Mark Beaumont gave the album three out of five stars, specifically praising O'Riordan's vocals. Charis McGowan of Clash summed up her review, "An album pieced together by a band in mourning, with the sweet sadness of O'Riordan‘s voice layered over, makes it cruder, rawer yet ultimately more truthful and hard-hitting, evoking the charged vulnerability of their very first releases" and gave the release eight out of 10.

Sales chart performance
In the End placed sixth on the midweek UK Albums Chart, eventually placing at 10th on the full week chart.

Track listing
All lyrics written by Dolores O'Riordan; all music composed by O'Riordan and Noel Hogan, except where noted.
"All Over Now" – 4:16
"Lost" (O'Riordan) – 4:00
"Wake Me When It's Over" (O'Riordan) – 4:12
"A Place I Know" – 4:26
"Catch Me If You Can" (O'Riordan) – 4:38
"Got It" (O'Riordan) – 4:02
"Illusion" – 4:07
"Crazy Heart" – 3:25
"Summer Song" (Dan Brodbeck and O'Riordan) – 3:34
"The Pressure" – 3:22
"In the End" – 2:57

Japanese bonus track
"All Over Now" (demo) – 4:30

Personnel

The Cranberries
Mike Hogan – bass guitar
Noel Hogan – guitar
Fergal Lawler – drums
Dolores O'Riordan – vocals

Additional personnel
Johanna Cranitch – vocals
Andy Earl – photography
Cally Calloman – design
Andy Larkin – artwork
Stephen Street – production

Charts

Awards

References

External links

2019 albums
Albums produced by Stephen Street
Albums published posthumously
BMG Rights Management albums
The Cranberries albums